Shahid Mohammadpur (also Romanized as Shahīd Moḩammadpūr; also known as Sāmānlū (Persian: سامانلو)) is a village in Angut-e Gharbi Rural District, Anguti District, Germi County, Ardabil Province, Iran. At the 2006 census, its population was 352, in 85 families.

References 

Tageo

Towns and villages in Germi County